The National Population and Family Planning Commission (NPFPC; 2003–2013), formerly the National Family Planning Commission (NFPC; 1981–2003), was a cabinet-level executive department under the State Council, responsible for population and family planning policy in the People's Republic of China. The commission was dissolved and superseded by the National Health and Family Planning Commission in March 2013, during the first session of the 12th National People's Congress.

The agency was managed by a minister and four vice ministers.

List of Ministers

See also 
 Family planning policy of Mainland China
 One-child policy
 Ministry of Health of the People's Republic of China

References

External links
National Population and Family Planning Commission Official Website

Government agencies of China
State Council of the People's Republic of China
1981 establishments in China
Government agencies established in 1981
Organizations based in Beijing
Family planning
Demographics of China